Zacharias Papadas (1876 - May 8, 1907) was a Greek soldier who was part of the Macedonian Struggle. He was nicknamed Captain Foufas.

References

1876 births
1907 deaths
Greek soldiers
People from Leonidio